Al-Nasāʾī (214 – 303 AH;  829 – 915 CE), full name Abū ʿAbd al-Raḥmān Aḥmad ibn Shuʿayb ibn ʿAlī ibn Sīnān al-Nasāʾī, (variant: Abu Abdel-rahman Ahmed ibn Shua'ib ibn Ali ibn Sinan ibn Bahr ibn Dinar Al-Khurasani), was a noted collector of hadith (sayings of Muhammad), of Persian origin from the city of Nasa (early Khorasan and present day Turkmenistan), and the author of "As-Sunan", one of the six canonical hadith collections recognized by Sunni Muslims. From his "As-Sunan al-Kubra (The Large Sunan)" he wrote an abridged version, "Al-Mujtaba" or Sunan al-Sughra (The Concise Sunan). Of the fifteen books he is known to have written, six treat the science of hadīth.

Biography 

Al-Nasa'i himself states he was born in the year 830 (215 h.) - although some say it was in 829 or 869 (214 or 255 h.) - in the city of Nasa in present-day Turkmenistan - part of Khorasan, a region in Western Asia and Central Asia known for its many centres of Islamic learning. There he attended the gatherings and circles of knowledge, known as "halqas". At about 15 years old, he began his travels with his first journey to Qutaibah. He covered the whole Arabian Peninsula seeking knowledge from scholars in Iraq, Kufa, the Hijaz, Syria and Egypt, where he eventually settled. A habit of his was to fast every other day, as this was a habit of Dawud.

Death 
In 302 AH/915 AD, he stopped by in the city of Damascus in between his long journey from Cairo to Mecca just as a stopping point. Near the time of his death, he had become a renowned scholar in the Islamic world and decided to give a speech in the Umayyad Mosque as a scholar of his repute tends to do. The lecture he did was on the virtues of the companions of Muhammad, specifically throughout the lecture he recited the virtues of Ali that he had heard of throughout his life. His narrating the virtues of Ali railed up the crowd due to the anti-alid sentiments in Damascus. In opposition, the crowd felt that there was nothing about Muawiya I in the lecture and asked him to narrate something related to the Umayyad caliph. He responded back by saying the only narration that he had heard about him about Muawiya by Muhammed was when Muhammed prayed to Allah saying "May Allah not fill his stomach". The crowd took this narration as a demerit from Muhammad leading the crowd to beat him and he eventually died due to his injuries on the outskirts of the city.

Teachers 
According to the hafiz Ibn Hajr Alaih, al-Nasa'i's teachers were too numerous to name, but included:

 Ishaq Ibn Rahwayh
 Imam Abu Daud Al-Sijistani (author of Sunan Abu Dawood)
 Qutayba ibn Sa'id

Hafiz ibn Hajr and others claimed that Imam Bukhari was among his teachers.  However Al-Mizzi, refutes that the Imam ever met him.  As-Sakhawi gives the reasons in great detail for al-Mizzi's claim that they never met, but argues these must apply also to his claim that An-Nasa'i heard from Abu Dawud. Moreover, Ibn Mundah narrates the following: We were informed by Hamzah, that an-Nasa'i, Abu Abd-ur-Rahman informed us saying, 'I heard Muhammad Ibn Isma'il Al-Bukhari...' Ibrahim ibn Ya'qub al-Juzajani was also an influence.

In Egypt an-Nasa'i began to lecture, mostly narrating ahadith (hadith plural) to the extent that he became known by the title "Hafizul Hadeeth".  His lectures were well attended and among his many students were the scholars:

 Imam Abul Qasim Tabrani
 Imam Abu Bakr Ahmed ibn Muhammad, also known as Allamah ibn Sunni
 Sheikh Ali, the son of the Muhaddith, Imam Tahawi.

School of Thought 
Imam Izzakie was a follower of the Shafi'i fiqh (jurisprudence) according to Allamah as-Subki, Shah Waliullah, Shah Abdulaziz and many other scholars. The Great Scholar Allamah Anwar Shah Kashmiri and Ibn Taymiyyah consider him a Hanbali.

Family
Imam an-Nasa'i had four wives but historians mention only one son, Abdul Kareem, a narrator of the Sunan of his father.

Books 
Selected works:

 As-Sunan al-Kubra
 Sunan Al-Sugra/ Al-Mujtana/ Al-Mujtaba
 Amul Yawmi Wallaylah
 Kitaby Dufai wal Matrookeen
 Khasais of Amir Al Momenin
 Al-Jurhu wa Ta'adeel
 Sunan An-Nisa'i
 Qasayis e Murtazavi

References

External links

 Biodata at MuslimScholars.info
 Biography at Sunnah.com

Hadith compilers
Muhaddiths from Nishapur
Biographical evaluation scholars
820s births
915 deaths
Year of birth uncertain
10th-century Iranian people
9th-century Iranian people
9th-century jurists
10th-century jurists